Serbia competed at the 2011 World Aquatics Championships in Shanghai, China.

Medalists

Swimming

There will be 8 swimmers (6 men & 2 women) that will compete at the 2011 World Aquatics Championships.

Men

Milorad Čavić, Ivan Lenđer, Radovan Siljevski, Čaba Silađi, Velimir Stjepanović, Stefan Šorak.

Women

Nađa Higl, Miroslava Najdanovski.

Results
Men

Women

Water polo

Men

Team Roster 

Slobodan Soro
Marko Avramovic
Zivko Gocic
Vanja Udovicic – Captain
Marko Cuk
Dusko Pijetlovic
Slobodan Nikic
Milan Aleksic
Nikola Radjen
Filip Filipovic
Andrija Prlainovic
Stefan Mitrovic
Gojko Pijetlovic

Group B

Quarterfinals

Semifinals

Gold medal game

Medal table

References

Nations at the 2011 World Aquatics Championships
2011 in Serbian sport
Serbia at the World Aquatics Championships